Bruce William Bell (born February 15, 1965) is a Canadian former professional ice hockey defenceman.

Bell started his National Hockey League career with the Quebec Nordiques in 1984. He also played with the St. Louis Blues, New York Rangers and Edmonton Oilers.  He was named to the NHL All-Rookie Team in 1985.

As a youth, he played in the 1978 Quebec International Pee-Wee Hockey Tournament with a minor ice hockey team from Toronto.

During the 1990–91 season, Bell was traded to the Minnesota North Stars in exchange for Kari Takko, making it the "Takko Bell Trade", as a play on the fast food restaurant chain. After retiring from hockey he turned to coaching and opened his own hockey school.

Career statistics

References

External links 

1965 births
Adirondack Red Wings players
Binghamton Rangers players
Brantford Alexanders players
Brantford Smoke players
Canadian ice hockey defencemen
Canadian people of Scottish descent
Cape Breton Oilers players
Chicago Wolves (IHL) players
Colorado Rangers players
EC VSV players
Edmonton Oilers players
Fort Worth Fire players
Halifax Citadels players
Houston Aeros (1994–2013) players
Ice hockey people from Toronto
Kalamazoo Wings (1974–2000) players
Living people
Milwaukee Admirals (IHL) players
New York Rangers players
Phoenix Mustangs players
Quebec Nordiques draft picks
Quebec Nordiques players
Reno Rage players
Sacramento River Rats players
St. John's Maple Leafs players
St. Louis Blues players
Sault Ste. Marie Greyhounds players
Windsor Spitfires players
Canadian expatriate ice hockey players in Austria